Breidden Hill is an extinct volcanic hill in Powys, Wales, near the town of Welshpool. It is immediately surrounded by the villages of Trewern, Middletown, Criggion, Crew Green and Llandrinio. Footpaths which lead up to the summit provide excellent 360 degree views over Powys and over the border with England to the Shropshire Plain.

The five hills are sometimes collectively known as the Breidden Hills, and form a northern extension of the Long Mountain.

There are remains of a British Iron Age hillfort en route which may have been the site of the last stand of Caractacus. Rodney's Pillar at the top was built by the gentlemen of Montgomeryshire who supplied oak wood from the area and shipped it down the River Severn (which runs nearby at Bausley with Criggion) to Bristol where Admiral Rodney's naval fleet was built.  Rodney's Pillar is increasingly being used as a navigational aid by helicopter pilots in this area, due to its visibility from large areas of Wales.

Beginning around 1789, for many years members of the Breidden Society, founded by John Dovaston (1740–1808), met near Rodney's Pillar for an annual festival of food, drink, poetry, and song; records of their meetings for 1809–15 are preserved at the Houghton Library of Harvard University (MS Eng 1168).

There is a large quarry on the western and northern sides of Breidden Hill.  The rock is a thick gabbroic-dolerite laccolith, which is a source of roadstone.

On 27 June 2018, a wildfire broke out on Breidden Hill, destroying an area of grassland close to Rodney's Pillar.

See also
List of hillforts in Wales
Bredon Hill and Bredon village in Worcestershire

References

Further reading

External links
BBC Wales feature on the Iron Age hillfort
Photos of Breidden Hill and surrounding area on geograph
Shropshire Geology website

Sites of Special Scientific Interest in Montgomery
Hillforts in Powys
Mountains and hills of Powys
Volcanism of Wales
Pre-Holocene volcanism
Extinct volcanism
Laccoliths